Haemantheae are a tribe of subfamily Amaryllidoideae (family Amaryllidaceae). They are herbaceous monocot perennial flowering plants with a predominantly African distribution. Three subtribes are proposed and six genera including the type genus, Haemanthus, are included. They are characterised by the presence of baccate (berry) fruit.

Taxonomy

Phylogeny 
The placement of Haemantheae within subfamily Amaryllidoideae is shown in the 
following cladogram:

Subdivision 
There are three subtribes, with six genera
 Cliviinae D.Müll.-Doblies & U.Müll.-Doblies
 Haemanthinae Pax
 Gethyllidinae Meerow

The subtribes are related as follows:

Cliviinae: Two genera - Clivia, Cryptostephanus

Haemanthinae: Type - two genera, Haemanthus, Scadoxus

Gethyllidinae: Two genera - Apodolirion, Gethyllis

References

Bibliography

External links 

Amaryllidoideae
Monocot tribes